Ethan Watters is an American journalist. He is the author of articles for The New York Times Magazine, Spin, Details, Mother Jones, Glamour, GQ, Esquire, and the San Francisco Chronicle Magazine as well as books. He has also appeared on a number of media outlets such as Good Morning America, Talk of the Nation, and CNN.

Personal
Watters is married and has children. He and his family live in San Francisco, California.

Career
In 1994, Watters co-founded, along with two others, the San Francisco Writers' Grotto, which now has 33 offices and serves as a workspace for over 50 writers each month. He also teaches classes here. His work focuses on psychiatry and social psychology.

Books

With co-author Richard Ofshe

References

External links
Official Website
Ethan Watters at Simon & Schuster

Living people
Year of birth missing (living people)